Wilson River, a perennial river of the Hastings River catchment, is located in the Mid North Coast region of New South Wales, Australia.

Course and features
Wilson River rises on the south-eastern slopes of Mount Banda Banda in Willi Willi National Park, and flows generally east southeast, before reaching its confluence with the Maria River, near Telegraph Point, north of Wauchope. The river descends  over its  course.

Glencoe Creek is a tributary.

See also

 Rivers of New South Wales
 List of rivers of New South Wales (A–K)
 List of rivers of Australia
Wilson River (disambiguation)

References

External links
 

Rivers of New South Wales
Mid North Coast